Brief Reunion is a 2011 American thriller film featuring Joel de la Fuente as Aaron, a successful New England entrepreneur who is haunted by the sudden arrival of a mysterious old friend from his past.  It was written and directed by John Daschbach and shot in New England.  It also stars Alexie Gilmore, Scott Shepherd, Francie Swift and Quentin Mare.

Synopsis
Aaron Clark lives a comfortable life in New England. He seems to have it all: financial security, a beautiful wife, and a close-knit circle of friends. But this peaceful existence is shattered by the sudden and unnerving arrival of Teddy, a former classmate and the proverbial snake. Teddy worms back into their lives, “befriending” Aaron’s wife and assistant.

He hijacks a 40th birthday surprise and systematically stalks Aaron — at home, at work, and in cyberspace. Bitter over Aaron’s success, Teddy pries into his business affairs, hinting at improprieties through a combination of extortion and revenge.

Relentlessly, he pushes toward destruction by unearthing and dissecting the past, until one day Aaron snaps. Now everybody asks, is Aaron
the man he appears to be? Or is it true that “Nobody really knows anybody, least of all themselves?”.

References

External links
Brief Reunion Official Site
 Brief Reunion Distributor Site
 Brief Reunion - movie trailer
 New York Times review, January 17, 2013
 LA-Times review, January 17, 2013

2011 films
American thriller films
Films shot in New Hampshire
2010s thriller films
2010s English-language films
2010s American films